Events from the year 1978 in Sweden

Incumbents
 Monarch – Carl XVI Gustaf
 Prime Minister – Thorbjörn Fälldin, Ola Ullsten

Events
18 October – Thorbjörn Fälldin resigns as Prime Minister of Sweden, and is replaced with Ola Ullsten.

Births

 30 January – Daniel Lindström, singer and winner of Idol 2004 (Sweden)
 22 March – Björn Lind, cross country skier.
 29 May – Pelle Almqvist, singer-songwriter of The Hives
 1 August – Björn Ferry, biathlete.
 20 August – Anneli Heed, stand-up comedian, impersonator, and voice actress/dubber

Deaths

 4 February – Olle Åkerlund, sailor (born 1911).
 17 February – Erik Charpentier, gymnast (born 1897).
 3 April – Karl Asplund, poet, short story writer and art historian (born 1890).

References

 
Sweden
Years of the 20th century in Sweden